The Louis Riel School Division (LRSD; , DSL-R) is a school division in Winnipeg, Manitoba, offering English-language and French-immersion education to its students.

It was broadly formed in 1998 with the voluntary amalgamation of the Norwood and St. Boniface School Divisions. Following the 2001 announcement by the Minister of Education, Training and Youth to reduce Manitoba's school divisions from 54 to 37, the St. Vital School Division merged with St. Boniface in 2002, officially establishing the new Louis Riel School Division.

List of schools

Elementary and K-8 schools

Middle and secondary schools

Others

Notable alumni

List of notable people that graduated from a secondary school in the division.

See also
List of school districts in Manitoba

References

External links
 Official site
School_Division
School divisions in Winnipeg